Nam Wa Po is a village in Lam Tsuen, Tai Po District, Hong Kong.

Administration
Nam Wa Po is a recognized village under the New Territories Small House Policy. It is one of the villages represented within the Tai Po Rural Committee. For electoral purposes, Nam Wa Po is part of the Lam Tsuen Valley constituency, which is currently represented by Richard Chan Chun-chit.

References

External links

 Delineation of area of existing village Nam Wa Po (Tai Po) for election of resident representative (2019 to 2022)

Villages in Tai Po District, Hong Kong
Lam Tsuen